Prionomelia is a genus of moths in the family Geometridae. It lives mostly in the southwestern United States, specifically Arizona, New Mexico, and Texas.

Species
Prionomelia spododea (Hulst, 1896)

References

Geometridae